Masaka Hospital, may refer to one of the following

 Masaka Regional Referral Hospital, a 750-bed regional referral and teaching hospital in Uganda
 Masaka Hospital, Rwanda, a district hospital in Kacuciro District, Kigali, Rwanda